St. Theresa's School is a Christian religious minority institution located in Bendur, Mangalore, India. The school is under the management of the Bethany Congregation nuns. It is affiliated to the Council for the Indian School Certificate Examinations. It is known to be the only ICSE school in the city of Mangalore. This institution was established on 17 June 1996.

Facilities and associations 
This various facilities provided by this school are
 Physics Lab
 Chemistry Lab
 Biology Lab
 Indoor Stadium
 Playground
 Kids park
 Music room
 Dance room
 Math park
 Hobby classes

The various associations in this school include
 Little Way Association
 Parent Teacher Association
 Road safety patrol
 St. Theresa's school band
 Alumni Association
 Young student movement

See also 
 List of schools in India
 List of Christian schools in India

References

Christian schools in Karnataka
Private schools in Karnataka
Schools in Mangalore
Educational institutions established in 1996
1996 establishments in Karnataka